Anampses cuvier, the pearl wrasse, 
is a fish found in the Pacific Ocean.

Etymology
The fish is named in honor of French naturalist and zoologist Georges Cuvier.

References

Pearl wrasse
Fish described in 1824
Taxa named by Jean René Constant Quoy
Taxa named by Joseph Paul Gaimard